The Eastland was a passenger ship used for tours, based in Chicago, Illinois, United States.

Eastland may refer to:

 Eastland, an obsolete name for Estonia
 USS Eastland (APA-163), a U.S. Navy attack transport ship launched in 1944
 SS Eastland, a navy ship
 Eastland Company, an English crown-chartered company founded in 1579
 Eastland Shopping Centre, Ringwood, Victoria, Australia
 Eastland Center, any of several shopping malls
 Eastland Mall, any of several shopping malls
 Eastland (Charlotte neighborhood), North Carolina, United States
 Eastland, Lexington, Kentucky, United States
 Eastland County, Texas, United States
 Eastland, Texas, county seat of Eastland County
 Eastland, an unofficial name of northeastern New Zealand, see Gisborne District

People with the surname
 James Eastland (1904–1986), American politician

See also
 Ostland 
 Eastlands (disambiguation)
 Eastland High School (disambiguation)